Ed Blankmeyer (born December 15, 1954) is an American professional baseball coach and former second baseman. He is the manager of the Brooklyn Cyclones of the New York–Penn League.

Career
Blankmeyer played college baseball at Seton Hall University from 1973 to 1976. He served as an assistant coach at Seton Hall before serving as the head baseball coach at St. John's University from 1996 to 2019. Under Blankmeyer, St. John's won six Big East Conference Regular Season Championships and five Big East Tournament Championships. They appeared in ten  NCAA Regionals and one NCAA Super Regional. Blankmeyer won eight Big East Coach of the Year Awards and four ABCA Northeast Region Coach of the Year Awards.

On January 6, 2020, Blankmeyer stepped down from St. John's and became the manager of the Brooklyn Cyclones.

Head coaching record
Below is a table of Blankmeyer's yearly records as an NCAA head baseball coach.

References

External links

1954 births
Living people
Pulaski Phillies players
Seton Hall Pirates baseball coaches
Seton Hall Pirates baseball players
St. John's Red Storm baseball coaches
Minor league baseball managers